The Swiss Performance Index (SPI) is a wide total-return index that tracks equity primarily listed on SIX Swiss Exchange with a free-float of at least 20%, and excluding investment companies. The index covers large, mid and small caps and is weighted by market capitalization. Most constituents, although not all, are domiciled in Switzerland or the Principality of Liechtenstein.

The SPI is Switzerland's most closely followed performance index. It is used as a benchmark for mutual funds, index funds and ETFs, and as an underlying index for derivative financial instruments such as options, futures and structured products.

In 2020, the SPI, along with other SIX indices, was endorsed under the EU Benchmarks Regulation and is registered with the European Securities and Markets Authority, which means that it can be used as an underlying for financial products sold in the EU.

SPI Universe

The underlying share universe of the SPI is the Swiss All Share Index and includes approximately 230 equity issues. For a company's shares to be included in the SPI, the company must be domiciled in Switzerland and the shares must have a free float equal to or greater than 20%.

In 1998, investment companies were taken out of the SPI Family and put into the specially designed Investment Index in order to avoid double (direct + indirect) listing of SPI components. Exceptions to this rule can be granted to Investment Companies that invest in companies not primarily listed at SIX.

The SPI acts in turn as the universe of several other indices offered by SIX Swiss Exchange:

 the Swiss Market Index and the SPI 20
 the SMI MID and the SMI Expanded
 the SPI Extra, defined as the complement of the SMI in the SPI universe
 the Swiss Leader Index and its complement, the SPI ex SLI
 various subindices of the SPI, by size and sector, described further down

Components

Below is the list of the 214 SPI shares as of September 18, 2020. Some of the companies are primarily listed in Switzerland, but have their headquarters outside Switzerland and were included in the underlying share universe upon request. Some companies have two kinds of shares and thus appear twice in the SPI.

Classification

SPI components are classified by size, by sector as well as by security category.

By size

There are three size categories of SPI components: large-cap, mid-cap and small-cap. Three SPI subindices reflect these sizes, respectively the SPI Large, the SPI Middle and the SPI Small. Two more subindices cover Large+Middle as well as Middle+Small.

The SPI 20 is another SPI subindex that contains the same companies as in the Swiss Market Index. It mostly overlaps with the SPI Large, but does not fully coincide because of the rules specific to the SMI. For this reason, another subindex, the SPI Extra, includes all SPI companies not in the SPI 20.

By sector

The SPI is divided into sectors on the basis of economic activity. This classification is based on the Industry Classification Benchmark ICB from Dow Jones and FTSE, which simplifies international performance comparisons significantly.

By security category

SPI Stocks are also grouped by security category: registered shares, bearer share, participation certificates.

Methodology

Paid prices are taken into account in calculating the SPI as a whole. If no paid prices are available, the index is calculated on the basis of bid prices. The index is recalculated and published every three minutes. On 1 June 1987, the SPI was standardised at 1000 points.

Swiss All Share Index 

The Swiss All Share Index contains all companies primarily listed at SIX that are headquartered in Switzerland or the Principality of Liechtenstein. It has 232 components. These are all the SPI components, but also equity with less than 20% of free float and investment companies. The additional companies contained in the Swiss All Share Index are listed below, as of November 12, 2019.

Milestones 
The following table shows historic milestones of  the Swiss Performance Index Total Return. Latest seen values are not final: italic indicates that the value may be seen again if the bear market (-20% from the peak) persists; parentheses indicate that the value will be seen again if we reenter a bull market (maximum value reached again);  Other values may be seen again in case of a crash (assuming a threshold of -50%).

External links 
 Statistical data since 1987

Notes and references

Swiss stock market indices